The screaming piha (Lipaugus vociferans) is a species of passerine bird in the family Cotingidae. It is found in humid forests in the Amazon and tropical parts of the Mata Atlântica in South America. They are most notable for their extraordinarily loud voice.

Distribution and habitat 

Description 
Both sexes have dull grey plumage (wings and tail often somewhat duskier) and the underparts are paler grey. Juveniles are grey tinged with brown or rust.

Behavior and ecology 
The screaming piha is an elusive bird despite its distinctive voice, remaining still for long periods and blending in with tree branches. It is usually solitary, but may sometimes join a mixed species foraging group.

Diet and feeding 
Screaming pihas feed mainly on fruits, but also consumes insects, sometimes flying out from its perch to pluck a fruit or catch an insect in the air with a trogon-like hover.

Vocalizations and mimicry 
The screaming piha has a voice that is extraordinarily loud, reaching 116 dB,  second only to that of the white bellbird. In the breeding season, up to ten males may gather in loose leks, where they sing to attract females. The Cofán people of Ecuador call it the Pwe-pwe Yoh, which is a reference to its voice. Among the Ecuadorian Secoyas, the bird is known as the Kwow-kwee-yo. The sound is frequently used in movies as a sound typical of the Amazon rainforest.

Status and conservation 
The screaming piha is adapting well to human settlement areas like gardens and parks, and is considered to be of least concern by BirdLife International.

References

External links

 Calls and songs on the xeno canto collection
 Screaming Piha recording British Library. Accessed 2018-09-28
 Screaming pihas on Freesound. Freesound.org. Accessed 2022-09-20
 Photos, videos and observations at Cornell Lab of Ornithologys Birds of the World

screaming piha
Birds of the Amazon Basin
Birds of the Guianas
Birds of the Atlantic Forest
screaming piha
Birds of Brazil
Taxonomy articles created by Polbot